Alexa Szvitacs (born 1 August 1990) is a Hungarian para table tennis player and former World Junior bronze medalist.

Illness
In August 2018, Szvitacs suddenly fell ill at home with a high fever and nausea. Her brother phoned for an ambulance and took her to hospital in Debrecen for life saving surgery. She developed toxic shock syndrome which resulted in the amputation of her left forearm and all of her toes and was diagnosed with tarsal tunnel syndrome, she was in rehabilitation for months afterwards.

References

1990 births
Living people
People from Kecskemét
Paralympic table tennis players of Hungary
Hungarian female table tennis players
Hungarian amputees
Table tennis players at the 2020 Summer Paralympics
Paralympic medalists in table tennis
Medalists at the 2020 Summer Paralympics
Chinese female table tennis players
Paralympic bronze medalists for Hungary
Sportspeople from Bács-Kiskun County